Daniel Toft Jakobsen (born 12 May 1978 in Kongens Lyngby) is a Danish politician, who is a member of the Folketing for the Social Democrats political party. He was elected into parliament at the 2015 Danish general election.

Political career
Jakobsen first ran for parliament in the 2011 election, where he received 2,424 votes. While not enough for a seat in parliament, this made him the Social Democrats' secondary substitute in the East Jutland constituency. He acted as substitute for Kirsten Brosbøl from 23 October 2012 to 1 December 2013. He sat in the municipal council of Hedensted Municipality from 2014 to 2015. He ran again in the 2015 election, where he was elected into parliament with 4,344 votes. He was reelected in 2019 with 4,615 votes.

External links 
 Biography on the website of the Danish Parliament (Folketinget)

References 

Living people
1978 births
People from Kongens Lyngby
Social Democrats (Denmark) politicians
Danish municipal councillors
Members of the Folketing 2015–2019
Members of the Folketing 2019–2022